"California Here I Come" is a song by American singer-songwriter Sophie B. Hawkins, which was released in 1992 as the second single from her debut studio album Tongues and Tails. The song was written by Hawkins and produced by Rick Chertoff and Ralph Schuckett. The song's music video was directed by Kevin Kerslake and produced by Line Postmyr and Tina Silvey.

Background
The song's bridge was influenced by John Steinbeck's 1939 novel The Grapes of Wrath and features Hawkins reciting the Lord's Prayer. In 2004, Hawkins noted that "aspects of the chorus were influenced by Bugs Bunny going through the golden gates and finding 50 foot carrots". She added, "I had never been to California when I wrote the song. The lyrics are great to savor live, and they get truer somehow as time goes on."

Critical reception
On its release, Larry Flick of Billboard considered the song to be "an equally literate, highly potent pop/rock journey" to Hawkins' debut single "Damn I Wish I Was Your Lover". He praised the single remix as providing "more emphasis on the melody" which "gives the track a lighter, more accessible tone". Music & Media commented: "With this follow up to "Damn I Wish I Was Your Lover", this young singer/songwriter is destined to become the next Cyndi Lauper." Victoria Thieberger of The Age noted Hawkins' "distinctive voice" was "measured but warm" on the track. She also praised the song for being "richly orchestrated with a romantic synth sound over a heavy bass".

Track listings
7-inch and cassette single
 "California Here I Come" (remix) – 4:20
 "Saviour Child" – 4:45

CD single (UK and Europe)
 "California Here I Come" (remix) – 4:25
 "California Here I Come" (LP version) – 4:38
 "Saviour Child" – 4:43

CD single (Europe)
 "California Here I Come" – 4:20
 "Saviour Child" – 4:43
 "Damn I Wish I Was Your Lover" (remix) – 4:39

CD single (US release)
 "California Here I Come" – 4:20
 "Saviour Child" – 4:43

Personnel
Production
 Rick Chertoff, Ralph Schuckett – producers of "California Here I Come" and "Saviour Child"
 Steve Churchyard – recording on "California Here I Come" and "Saviour Child"
 David Leonard – mixing on "California Here I Come"

Other
 Sophie B. Hawkins – illustration

Charts

Release history

References

1992 songs
1992 singles
Columbia Records singles
Song recordings produced by Rick Chertoff
Songs written by Sophie B. Hawkins
Sophie B. Hawkins songs